In linear algebra, a branch of mathematics, the polarization identity is any one of a family of formulas that express the inner product of two vectors in terms of the norm of a normed vector space. 
If a norm arises from an inner product then the polarization identity can be used to express this inner product entirely in terms of the norm. The polarization identity shows that a norm can arise from at most one inner product; however, there exist norms that do not arise from any inner product. 

The norm associated with any inner product space satisfies the parallelogram law:  
In fact, as observed by John von Neumann, the parallelogram law characterizes those norms that arise from inner products. 
Given a normed space , the parallelogram law holds for  if and only if there exists an inner product  on  such that  for all  in which case this inner product is uniquely determined by the norm via the polarization identity.

Polarization identities

Any inner product on a vector space induces a norm by the equation

The polarization identities reverse this relationship, recovering the inner product from the norm.
Every inner product satisfies:

Solving for  gives the formula  If the inner product is real then  and this formula becomes a polarization identity for real inner products.

Real vector spaces

If the vector space is over the real numbers then the polarization identities are:

These various forms are all equivalent by the parallelogram law:

This further implies that  class is not a Hilbert space whenever , as the parallelogram law is not satisfied.

Complex vector spaces

For vector spaces over the complex numbers, the above formulas are not quite correct because they do not describe the imaginary part of the (complex) inner product. 
However, an analogous expression does ensure that both real and imaginary parts are retained. 
The complex part of the inner product depends on whether it is antilinear in the first or the second argument. 
The notation  which is commonly used in physics will be assumed to be antilinear in the  argument while  which is commonly used in mathematics, will be assumed to be antilinear its the  argument. 
They are related by the formula:

The real part of any inner product (no matter which argument is antilinear and no matter if it is real or complex) is a symmetric bilinear map that for any  is always equal to:

It is always a symmetric map, meaning that

and it also satisfies: 

Let 
 
Then  implies 
 
and 
 

Moreover, 
 
which proves that  

From  it follows that  and  so that 
 
which proves that  

Unlike its real part, the imaginary part of a complex inner product depends on which argument is antilinear. 

Antilinear in first argument

The polarization identities for the inner product  which is antilinear in the  argument, are

where  
The second to last equality is similar to the formula expressing a linear functional  in terms of its real part:  

Antilinear in second argument

 
So for any 

This expression can be phrased symmetrically as:

Summary of both cases

Thus if  denotes the real and imaginary parts of some inner product's value at the point  of its domain, then its imaginary part will be:

where the scalar  is always located in the same argument that the inner product is antilinear in.

Using  the above formula for the imaginary part becomes:

Reconstructing the inner product

In a normed space  if the parallelogram law

holds, then there exists a unique inner product  on  such that  for all 

Another necessary and sufficient condition for there to exist an inner product that induces a given norm  is for the norm to satisfy Ptolemy's inequality, which is:

Applications and consequences

Similarly,  is (purely) imaginary if and only if  
For example, from  it can be concluded that  is real and that  is purely imaginary.

Isometries

If  is a linear isometry between two Hilbert spaces (so  for all ) then 

that is, linear isometries preserve inner products. 

If  is instead an antilinear isometry then

Relation to the law of cosines

The second form of the polarization identity can be written as

This is essentially a vector form of the law of cosines for the triangle formed by the vectors  and  
In particular,

where  is the angle between the vectors  and

Derivation

The basic relation between the norm and the dot product is given by the equation

Then

and similarly

Forms (1) and (2) of the polarization identity now follow by solving these equations for  while form (3) follows from subtracting these two equations. 
(Adding these two equations together gives the parallelogram law.)

Generalizations

Symmetric bilinear forms

The polarization identities are not restricted to inner products. 

then

The so-called symmetrization map generalizes the latter formula, replacing  by a homogeneous polynomial of degree  defined by  where  is a symmetric -linear map.

The formulas above even apply in the case where the field of scalars has characteristic two, though the left-hand sides are all zero in this case. 
Consequently, in characteristic two there is no formula for a symmetric bilinear form in terms of a quadratic form, and they are in fact distinct notions, a fact which has important consequences in L-theory; for brevity, in this context "symmetric bilinear forms" are often referred to as "symmetric forms".

These formulas also apply to bilinear forms on modules over a commutative ring, though again one can only solve for  if 2 is invertible in the ring, and otherwise these are distinct notions. For example, over the integers, one distinguishes integral quadratic forms from integral  forms, which are a narrower notion.

More generally, in the presence of a ring involution or where 2 is not invertible, one distinguishes -quadratic forms and -symmetric forms; a symmetric form defines a quadratic form, and the polarization identity (without a factor of 2) from a quadratic form to a symmetric form is called the "symmetrization map", and is not in general an isomorphism. This has historically been a subtle distinction: over the integers it was not until the 1950s that relation between "twos out" (integral  form) and "twos in" (integral  form) was understood – see discussion at integral quadratic form; and in the algebraization of surgery theory, Mishchenko originally used  L-groups, rather than the correct  L-groups (as in Wall and Ranicki) – see discussion at L-theory.

Homogeneous polynomials of higher degree

Finally, in any of these contexts these identities may be extended to homogeneous polynomials (that is, algebraic forms) of arbitrary degree, where it is known as the polarization formula, and is reviewed in greater detail in the article on the polarization of an algebraic form.

See also

Notes and references

Bibliography

  
  
  

Abstract algebra
Linear algebra
Functional analysis
Vectors (mathematics and physics)
Norms (mathematics)
Mathematical identities